Gnjilan is a village in the municipality of Pirot, Serbia. According to the 2002 census, the village has a population of 2478 people.

See also
Populated places in Serbia

References

Populated places in Pirot District